Basie Jam is a 1973 studio album by Count Basie. This was Basie's first album with Norman Granz' newly founded Pablo Records.

Track listing 
All music composed by Count Basie

 "Doubling Blues" – 6:58
 "Hanging Out" – 9:35
 "Red Bank Blues" – 9:03
 "One-Nighter" – 11:45
 "Freeport Blues" – 11:44

Personnel 
 Count Basie - organ, piano
 Eddie "Lockjaw" Davis - tenor saxophone
 Zoot Sims
 J.J. Johnson - trombone
 Harry "Sweets" Edison - trumpet
 Irving Ashby - guitar
 Ray Brown - double bass
 Louie Bellson - drums

References 

1974 albums
Count Basie albums
Pablo Records albums
Albums produced by Norman Granz